Become the Media is the sixth spoken word album by Jello Biafra. Topics covered include the WTO Meeting of 1999, the 2000 presidential election, the Green Party, the International Monetary Fund, the Columbine High School massacre, and the H.O.P.E. conference.

Track listing

Disc one

Disc two

Disc three

Personnel 
Jello Biafra - producer, concept
Jim Altieri - cover photo
Mark Kellye - editing
Jason Rosenberg - construction
Jeff Williams - engineer

References

2000 albums
Alternative Tentacles albums
Spoken word albums by American artists
Jello Biafra albums